Littleborough is a hamlet in Nottinghamshire, England. Littleborough is the site of the Roman town of Segelocum or Agelocum, on the west bank of the River Trent where the road linking Lincoln and Doncaster bridged or forded the river.

The Church of England parish church of St Nicholas is Norman, and contains some Roman tiles in its stonework.

References

External links

reconstruction of Roman Segelocum

Villages in Nottinghamshire
Bassetlaw District